The Mountain Societies Development Support Programme is a branch of the Aga Khan Development Network ("AKDN") dedicated to improving the quality of life of the people of the mountainous oblasts of Tajikistan and Kyrgyzstan.

References
1. Pamir Power Plant: Using Natural and Local Resources to Generate Power

External links
 Description of MSDSP on AKDN official website

Aga Khan Development Network